Moosbach is a small river of Baden-Württemberg, Germany. It is a left tributary of the Fichtenberger Rot near Mainhardt.

See also
List of rivers of Baden-Württemberg

Rivers of Baden-Württemberg
Mainhardt Forest
Rivers of Germany